Phelps Motor Vehicle Company was a manufacturer of automobiles in Stoneham, Massachusetts, between 1903 and 1905.  In 1906 it was succeeded by the Shamut Motor Company.

History

Background 

Lucius J. Phelps was an inventor and an electrical and mechanical engineer who first came to prominence in 1886 for his Induction Telegraph patent that was developed for trains to receive live telegraph messages while moving.  In the late 1890's he became interested in steam powered vehicles and in 1901 marketed the Phelps Tractor.  The steam tractor was designed to be controlled by horse rains so that a coachman could operate it.  As Phelps Motor Company, Phelps then began developing a gasoline engine.

Phelps Motor Car 
In 1903 Phelps Motor Company became Phelps Motor Vehicle Company with Elliott C. Lee as president and L. J. Phelps as general manager.  The 1903 Phelps was a touring car model, equipped with a tonneau.  It could seat 4 passengers and sold for $2,000, .   L. J. Phelps designed the vertically mounted water-cooled straight-3 engine, situated at the front of the car, producing .  A 3-speed transmission was fitted.  The car was unusual in that it did not have a parameter frame but a backbone frame that enclosed the drive shaft, and this weight savings made for a  touring car.  In 1904 the engine was enlarged to 20-hp and the price was $2,500, .

Motorsports 

Phelps demonstrated his car in several endurance runs and hill climbs including a 1903 record 1 hour and 46 minute climb up Mount Washington.  He returned in 1904 for the first Climb to the Clouds and cut his time to 42 minutes, placing second in his class.  The Phelps motor car won a double victory in the1903 Eagle Rock, N.J. Hill Climb.

Fate 
L. J. Phelps designed a 4-cylinder engine but in September 1905 decided to retire to his Forty Oaks Ranch in Paradise, California.  The company and manufacturing plant were succeeded by the Shawmut Motor Company headed by E. C. Lee in 1906.  Lucius Phelps continued to patent automotive and other devices until his death at the age of 75 in 1925.

Models

See also
Explore Stoneham - Car Industry in Stoneham
Mt. Washington Road Auto Road history
Phelps images at Detroit Public Library

References

Defunct motor vehicle manufacturers of the United States
1900s cars
Vehicle manufacturing companies established in 1903
Vehicle manufacturing companies disestablished in 1905
Brass Era vehicles
Veteran vehicles
Motor vehicle manufacturers based in Massachusetts
American automotive engineers
American automotive pioneers
Cars introduced in 1903